The 1908–09 season was Manchester United's 17th season in the Football League and fourth in the First Division.

First Division

FA Cup

Squad statistics

References

Manchester United F.C. seasons
Manchester United